Edgar Cayce (March 18, 1877 – January 3, 1945) was an American attributed clairvoyant who claimed to speak from his higher self while in a trance-like state. His words were recorded by his friend, Al Layne; his wife, Gertrude Evans, and later by his secretary, Gladys Davis Turner. During the sessions, Cayce would answer questions on a variety of subjects such as healing, reincarnation, dreams, the afterlife, past lives, nutrition, Atlantis, and future events. Cayce, a devout Christian and Sunday-school teacher, said that his readings came from his subconscious mind exploring the dream realm, where he said all minds were timelessly connected. Cayce founded a non-profit organization, the Association for Research and Enlightenment, to record and facilitate the study of his channeling and to run a hospital. Cayce is known as "The Sleeping Prophet", the title of journalist Jess Stearn's 1967 Cayce biography. Religious scholars and thinkers, such as author Michael York, consider Cayce the founder and a principal source of many characteristic beliefs of the New Age movement.

Biography

Early life
Cayce was born on March 18, 1877, near Beverly, Kentucky, a small town about 100 miles north of Knoxville, Tennessee. His parents, Carrie Elizabeth (née Major) and Leslie Burr Cayce, were farmers and the parents of six children. As a child, Cayce reportedly saw the ghost of his deceased grandfather. He was confident that it was a ghost, because it became transparent if he "looked hard enough."

Cayce was brought to church at age 10, where he became engrossed in the Bible. Over the next two years, he read it from cover to cover a dozen times. In May 1889, while reading the Bible in his hut in the woods, Cayce said he encountered a woman with wings who told him that his prayers had been answered. The woman asked him what he wanted most of all. Cayce told biographer Thomas Sugrue that he was frightened, but told the woman that he wanted to help others, especially children. He eventually decided that he wanted to be a missionary.

Cayce said that the next night, after a complaint from his teacher (he said that he generally found it difficult to focus on his lessons), his father ruthlessly tested him on spelling and angrily knocked Cayce out of his chair. Cayce said that he heard the woman with wings tell him that if he went to sleep, "they" could help him. He put his head on his spelling book, and fell asleep.  When his father returned to the room and woke him up, he knew all of the answers and repeated anything in the book. He said that his father thought he had been fooling him before, and knocked him out of his chair again. Cayce said that he then studied all his schoolbooks that way: by sleeping on them.

He said that by 1892, he had become the best student in his class. On questioning, Cayce told the teacher that he saw pictures of the pages in the books. His father, proud of this accomplishment, spread the news.

During a school ball game, Cayce was struck in his coccyx and began to act strangely. He said that while asleep he diagnosed his ailment and recommended a cure. His family prepared the cure according to his instructions, and it worked. Cayce's reported ability to diagnose in his sleep did not return for several years.

1893–1912: Kentucky period

In December 1893, the Cayce family moved to Hopkinsville, Kentucky; they lived at 705 West Seventh, on the southeast corner of Seventh and Young Streets. Cayce received an eighth-grade education, and it is said by the Association for Research and Enlightenment that he noticed his clairvoyance, and he left the family farm to pursue employment.

Cayce's education ended in ninth grade because his family could not afford the cost.  A ninth-grade education was often considered sufficient for working-class children. Much of Cayce's younger years were then characterized by a search for employment.

On March 14, 1897, Cayce became engaged to Gertrude Evans. Throughout his life, Cayce was drawn to the Disciples of Christ. He read the Bible once a year, attended church, taught Sunday school, and recruited missionaries. He said that he could see auras around people, spoke to angels, and heard the voices of departed relatives. In his early years, he agonized about whether these prophetic abilities were spiritually delivered.

In 1900, Cayce formed a business partnership with his father to sell Woodmen of the World Insurance. In March of that year, however, he developed severe laryngitis which resulted in a complete loss of speech. Unable to work, he lived at home with his parents for almost a year. Cayce then decided to take up photography, an occupation which would strain his voice less. He began an apprenticeship at the photography studio of W. R. Bowles in Hopkinsville, and became proficient in his trade.

A traveling stage hypnotist and entertainer named Hart, who called himself "The Laugh Man", performed in 1901 at the Hopkinsville Opera House. Hart heard about Cayce's throat condition and offered to attempt a cure. Cayce accepted his offer and the experiment was conducted in the office of Manning Brown, the local throat specialist. Cayce's voice reportedly returned while he was in a hypnotic trance, but disappeared when he awakened. Hart unsuccessfully tried a post-hypnotic suggestion that Cayce's voice would continue to function after the trance

Since Hart had appointments in other cities, he could not continue his hypnotic treatments of Cayce; he said that he failed because Cayce would not enter the third stage of hypnosis and accept a suggestion. New York hypnotist John Duncan Quackenbos found the same impediment but, after returning to New York, suggested that Cayce should take over his own case in the second stage of hypnosis. The only local hypnotist, Al Layne, offered to help Cayce regain his voice. When Layne put Cayce into trance, Cayce communicated vocally. Cayce told Layne to give him (Cayce) a suggestion to increase blood circulation to his throat. Layne gave the suggestion; Cayce's throat reportedly turned bright red, and after 20 minutes Cayce (still in a trance) declared the treatment over. On awakening, his voice was said to have remained normal. Relapses occurred, but were reportedly corrected by Layne until the cure was eventually permanent.

Layne asked Cayce to describe Layne's ailments and suggest cures, and reportedly found the results accurate and effective. Layne considered Cayce's ability clairvoyance, and suggested that he offer his psychic diagnostic service to the public. Cayce was reluctant, since he had no idea what he was prescribing while asleep and did not know if his remedies were safe. He told Layne that he did not want to know anything about a patient, since it was not relevant. He agreed on the condition that readings would be free, and specified that if the readings ever hurt anyone, he would never do another. He began, with Layne's help, to offer free treatments to the townspeople. Layne described Cayce's method as "...a self-imposed hypnotic trance which induces clairvoyance". Reports of Cayce's work appeared in newspapers, which prompted a number of postal inquiries.  Cayce said that he could work as effectively with a letter from an individual as with a person present in the room. Given a person's name and location, Cayce claimed that he could diagnose the physical and mental conditions of what he called "the entity" and provide a remedy. Cayce was still reticent and worried, because "one dead patient was all he needed to become a murderer". His fiancée agreed, and few people knew what he was doing. Hypnotic subjects were commonly believed to be susceptible to insanity or poor physical health.

In May 1902, Cayce got a job in a bookshop in Bowling Green, Kentucky. He boarded with several young professionals, two of whom were doctors. Cayce lost his voice again and Layne came to help effect the normal cure, finally visiting every week. Still worried, Cayce kept the meetings secret and continued to refuse money for his readings. He invented Pit (or Board of Trade), a card game which simulated wheat-market trading. The game became popular, but when he sent the idea to a game company it copyrighted it and he received no royalties. Cayce still refused to give readings for money.

Cayce and Gertrude Evans married on June 17, 1903, and she moved to Bowling Green. They had three children: Hugh Lynn Cayce (1907–1982), Milton Porter Cayce (1911–1911), and Edgar Evans Cayce (1918–2013). Gertrude still disapproved of the readings, and Cayce still agonized over their morality. Layne revealed the activity to the professionals at the boarding house (one of whom was a magistrate and journalist), and the state medical authorities forced him to close his practice. He left to acquire osteopathic qualifications in Franklin. Cayce and Gertrude accepted the resulting publicity as best they could, aided by the diplomacy of the young doctors.

Cayce and a relative opened a photographic studio in Bowling Green, while the doctors formed a committee with colleagues to investigate the phenomenon with Cayce's cooperation. Experiments confirmed the accuracy of the readings, but Cayce refused a lucrative offer to go into business. After a violent examination by doctors while in a trance, Cayce refused any more investigations; he said that he would only do readings for those who needed help and believed in them.

In 1906 and 1907, fires burned down his two photographic studios and bankrupted him. Between the two fires, his first son was born on March 16, 1907. He became debt-free by 1909, and was ready to start again. In 1907, diagnostic successes in Cayce's family developed his confidence. He again refused an offer to go into business, this time with homeopath Wesley H. Ketchum of Hopkinsville, Kentucky (who was introduced by his father), and found a job at the H. P. Tresslar photography firm.

Ketchum was persistent, however, spreading information in medical circles and being the subject of an October 1910 newspaper story. When a reporter contacted Cayce, he said that he somehow had the ability to easily go into intuitive sleep when he wanted to; it was different from how he went to sleep normally. When asked the mechanism of the readings via the sleep method, Cayce said that it happened through the capabilities of the subconscious mind.

Ketchum again urged Cayce to join a company. After soul-searching for a whole night, Cayce accepted the offer under certain conditions (including that he not take money for the readings). He was prophesying. Cayce read the back readings, but they contained so many technical terms that he could not understand what he was doing. He preferred to put the readings on a more scientific basis, but only the doctors in Hopkinsville would cooperate and most of the patients were not there. Doctors from all specialties were needed, since the prescribed treatments varied widely.

Cayce and Gertrude still did not give therapeutic priority to the readings, and reportedly lost their second child because of this reticence. When Gertrude became ill with tuberculosis, they used the readings after the doctor had given up and the treatment cured her. In 1912, Cayce (whose everyday, conscious mind was not aware during the readings) discovered that Ketchum had not been honest with them and had gambled with their money. Ketchum said in his defense that the medical profession was not backing them. Cayce quit the company immediately and returned to the Tresslar photography firm in Selma, Alabama.

1912–1923: Selma period

Cayce's work increased with his fame, and he asked for donations to support himself and his family so he could practice full-time. He invented Pit, a card game based on commodities trading at the Chicago Board of Trade, to help raise money; the game is still sold today. Cayce continued to work in an apparent trance state with a hypnotist all his life, and his wife and eldest son later replaced Layne in this role. A secretary, Gladys Davis, transcribed his readings in shorthand.

Cayce's increasing popularity attracted entrepreneurs who wanted to use his reported clairvoyance. Although he was reluctant to help them, he was persuaded to give readings; this left him dissatisfied with himself. A cotton merchant offered him a hundred dollars a day for readings about the cotton market but, despite his poor finances, Cayce refused the merchant's offer. Some people wanted to know where to hunt for treasure, and others wanted to know the outcome of horse races.

Arthur Lammers, a wealthy printer and student of metaphysics, persuaded Cayce to give readings on philosophical subjects in 1923. He told Cayce that in his trance state, he spoke about Lammers' past lives and reincarnation (in which Lammers believed). Reincarnation was a popular contemporary subject, but is not an accepted part of Christian doctrine. Because of this, Cayce questioned his stenographer about what he said in his trance state and remained unconvinced. He challenged Lammers' statement that he had validated astrology and reincarnation:

Cayce: I said all that? ... I couldn't have said all that in one reading.
Lammers: No. But you confirmed it. You see, I have been studying metaphysics for years, and I was able by a few questions, by the facts you gave, to check what is right and what is wrong with a whole lot of the stuff I've been reading. The important thing is that the basic system which runs through all the religions, is backed up by you.
Cayce's stenographer recorded the following:

In this we see the plan of development of those individuals set upon this plane, meaning the ability to enter again into the presence of the Creator and become a full part of that creation.
Insofar as this entity is concerned, this is the third appearance on this plane, and before this one, as the monk. We see glimpses in the life of the entity now as were shown in the monk, in this mode of living. The body is only the vehicle ever of that spirit and soul that waft through all times and ever remain the same.

Cayce was unconvinced that he had been referring to reincarnation, but Lammers believed that the reading "open[ed] up the door" and continued to share his beliefs and knowledge with him. Lammers seemed intent upon convincing Cayce, because he felt that the reading confirmed his own strongly-held beliefs.

1923–1925: Dayton period 
Lammers asked Cayce to come to Dayton to pursue metaphysical truth via the readings, and Cayce eventually agreed; Gertrude was dubious, but interested. Cayce produced considerable metaphysical information in Dayton, which he tried to reconcile with Christianity. According to Lammers, the fifth chapter of Matthew was the constitution of Christianity and the Sermon on the Mount was its Declaration of Independence. Cayce's subconscious mind seemed as much at home with the language of metaphysics as it was with the language of anatomy and medicine.

Lammers, who wanted to determine the purpose of Cayce's clairvoyant readings, wanted to put up money for an organization supporting Cayce's healing methods. Cayce decided to accept the work, and asked his family to join him in Dayton as soon as possible. By the time the Cayce family arrived near the end of 1923, however, Lammers was in financial difficulties.

At this time, Cayce directed himself to readings centered around health. The remedies reportedly channeled often involved electrotherapy, ultraviolet light, diet, massage, less mental work and more relaxation. They were noticed by the American Medical Association, and Cayce felt that it was time to legitimize his operations with the aid of licensed medical practitioners. He reported that in a trance in 1925, "the voice" advised him to move to Virginia Beach, Virginia.

1925–1945: Virginia Beach period

Cayce's mature period, in which he created the institutions which survived him, may be considered to have begun in 1925. By this time, he was a professional psychic with a small staff of employees and volunteers. Cayce's readings increasingly had occult or esoteric themes.

Money was short, but help came from interested benefactors. The idea of an association and hospital was considered, but the readings insisted on Virginia Beach (which did not suit most of those involved). Gertrude began to conduct the readings. Morton Blumenthal (who worked at the New York Stock Exchange with his trader brother) became interested in the readings, shared Cayce's outlook, and offered to finance his vision; Blumenthal bought the Cayce's a house in Virginia Beach.

The Association of National Investigations, to build a hospital and study the readings scientifically, was incorporated in Virginia on May 6, 1927. Blumenthal was the president, and his brother and several others were vice presidents. Cayce was secretary and treasurer, and Gladys was assistant secretary. To protect against prosecution, anyone requesting a reading was required to join the association and agree that they were participating in an experiment in psychic research. Moseley Brown, head of the psychology department at Washington and Lee University, became convinced of the readings and joined the association in early 1928.

On October 11, 1928, the dedication ceremony of the hospital complex was held. The complex contained a lecture hall, library, vault for storage of the readings, and offices for researchers. There was also a large living room, a 12-car garage, servants' quarters, and a tennis court. It contained "the largest lawn, in fact the only lawn, between the Cavalier and Cape Henry". Its first patient was admitted the following day.

The facility enabled checking and rechecking the remedies, Cayce's goal. There were consistent remedies for many illnesses (regardless of the patient), and Cayce hoped to produce a compendium for use by the medical profession. Shankar A. Bhisey, a chemist who also used "clairvoyant knowledge" to produce medicines, collaborated with Cayce to produce atomidine.

The raison d'être for the cures was the "assimilation of needed properties through the digestive system, from food taken into the body ... [All treatments, including all schools and types of treatment, were given in order to establish] the proper equilibrium of the assimilating system." Salt packs, poultices, hot compresses, chromotherapy, magnetism, vibrator treatment, massage, osteopathic manipulation, dental therapy, colonics, enemas, antiseptics, inhalants, homeopathy, essential oils, and mud baths were prescribed. Substances included oils, salts, herbs, iodine, witch hazel, magnesia, bismuth, alcohol, castoria, lactated pepsin, turpentine, charcoal, animated ash, soda, cream of tartar, aconite, laudanum, camphor, and gold solution. These were prescribed to overcome conditions that prevented proper digestion and assimilation of needed nutrients from the prescribed diet. The aim of the readings was to produce a healthy body, removing the cause of a specific ailment. Readings would indicate if the patient's recovery was problematic.

There was a months-long waiting list. Blumenthal and Brown had ambitious plans for a university dwarfing the hospital and a "parallel service for the mind and spirit", rivaling other universities in respectability. The university was scheduled to open on September 22, 1930. On September 16, Blumenthal called a meeting of the association and took over the hospital to curb expenses. He ended his support of the university after the first semester, and closed the association on February 26, 1931. Cayce removed the files of his readings from the hospital and brought them home.

During the Depression, Cayce turned his attention to spiritual teachings. In 1931, his friends and family asked him how they could become psychic. Out of this apparently-simple question came an eleven-year discourse which led to the creation of "study groups". In his altered state, Cayce relayed to the groups that the purpose of life is not to become psychic, but to become a more spiritually-aware and loving person. Study group number one was told that they could "bring light to a waiting world", and the lessons would still be studied in a hundred years. The readings were now about dreams, coincidence (synchronicity), developing intuition, the Akashic records, astrology, past-life relationships, soul mates and other esoteric subjects. On June 6, 1931, 61 people attended a meeting to carry on Cayce's work and form the Association for Research and Enlightenment (A.R.E.) In July, the new association was incorporated; Cayce returned his house to Blumenthal, and bought another.

His son Hugh Lynn proposed that they develop a library of research into the phenomena and sponsor study groups, with Cayce doing two readings a day. The association accepted this, and Hugh Lynn began a monthly bulletin for association members. The bulletin contained readings on general-interest subjects, interesting cases, book reviews on psychic subjects, health hints from readings, and news about psychic phenomena in other fields.

Hugh Lynn narrowed the mailing list to about 300, and the association's first annual congress was held in June 1932. He procured speakers on metaphysical and psychic subjects, and included public readings by Cayce. Members left the conference eager to start study groups in their own areas. Records were kept of everything which went on in the readings, including Cayce's attitudes and routines. Everything was then checked with the subjects of the readings (most of whom were not present during the reading), and the data was published in a study entitled "100 cases of clairvoyance". However, the scientific consensus was that the experiments were not conducted under test conditions. Hugh Lynn continued to build files of case histories, parallel studies in psychic phenomena, and research readings for the study groups.

Association activities remained simple. Members raised funds for an office, library and vault, which they added to the Cayce residence in 1940–41. No sign guided visitors to the center. Association membership averaged 500 to 600, with the annual turnover about 50 percent. The other half was a solid basis for research, an audience for case studies, pamphlets, and bulletins, including the congress bulletin, which was a yearbook and record of congress events. A mailing list of several thousand served people who remained interested in Cayce's activities.
  
Members were drawn from a number of Protestant denominations, from the Roman, Greek, Syrian and Armenian Catholic churches, theosophy, Christian Science, Spiritualism, and a number of Oriental religions. Cayce believed that if something made a person a better member of their church, it was good; if it took a person away from their church, it was bad. The philosophy of the readings was that truth is one, and each organization is part of this one; A.R.E. did not oppose any religious organization. The goal of the work was not new, but ancient and universal.
  
Both sons served in the military during World War II, and both married: Hugh Lynn in 1941, and Edgar Evans in 1942. A 1942 limited edition preceded the first trade edition of the only biography written during Cayce's lifetime: Thomas Sugrue's There is a River, published in March 1943. Interest in Cayce increased, and office staff were added. Since the letter carrier could no longer carry all the mail, Gertrude picked it up by car at the post office. Hugh Lynn was in the military; Cayce coped with the mail, and increased the number of his readings to four to six per day.

Cayce attained national prominence in 1943 after the publication of "Miracle Man of Virginia Beach" in Coronet magazine. World War II was taking its toll on American soldiers, and Cayce felt that he could not refuse families who requested help for loved ones who were missing in action. He increased the number of readings to eight per day in an attempt to reduce the ever-growing backlog of requests. Cayce said that this affected his health; it was emotionally draining, and often fatigued him. The readings themselves chided Cayce for attempting too much, saying that he should limit his workload to two life readings a day or his efforts would kill him.

From June 1943 to June 1944, Cayce did 1,385 readings; by August 1944, he had collapsed from the strain. When he took a reading on his situation, he was instructed to rest until he was well or dead. He and Gertrude went to the Virginia mountains, but he had a stroke in September and died on January 3, 1945, at age 67. Cayce is buried in Riverside Cemetery in Hopkinsville, Kentucky. Gertrude died three months later. The association continued classifying and cross-referencing over 14,000 files of readings which had been taken from March 31, 1901, to September 17, 1944, and the results have been disseminated in its publications.

Reported clairvoyance
Until September 1923, Cayce's readings were not systematically recorded or preserved. An October 10, 1922 Birmingham Post-Herald article quotes Cayce as saying that he had given 8,056 readings to date, however, and it is known that he gave 13,000 to 14,000 readings after that date. A total of 14,306 readings are available at the A.R.E. Cayce headquarters in Virginia Beach and on an online, members-only section with background information, correspondence, and follow-up documentation.

Other abilities attributed to Cayce include astral projection, prophecy, mediumship, access to the Akashic records and Book of Life, and seeing auras. He also used astrology and dreamwork in his practice and readings. Cayce said that he became interested in learning more about these subjects after he was told about the content of his readings, which he said that he never heard himself.

Supporters
Cayce's clients included Woodrow Wilson, Thomas Edison, Irving Berlin, and George Gershwin. Gina Cerminara wrote the 1950 book, Many Mansions, which explores Cayce's work. His sons, Edgar Evans Cayce and Hugh Lynn Cayce, wrote The Outer Limits of Edgar Cayce's Power in 1971.

Wesley Harrington Ketchum

Wesley Harrington Ketchum was a physician who worked with Cayce during the early 1900s.  Ketchum was born in Lisbon, Ohio on November 11, 1878, to Saunders C. Ketchum and Bertha Bennett, and was the oldest of seven children. He graduated from the Cleveland College of Homeopathic Medicine in 1904, and practiced medicine in Hopkinsville, Kentucky until 1912. Ketchum went to Honolulu, Hawaii via San Francisco in 1913, and opened a new practice. He returned to California in 1918 and established an office in Palo Alto, practicing there until the 1950s. Ketchum retired to southern California around 1963, settling in San Marino (near Pasadena). He died on November 28, 1968, in Canoga Park. Ketchum wrote The Discovery of Edgar Cayce, published by the A.R.E. Press, four years before Ketchum died.

Reception and controversy
Cayce advocated pseudohistorical ideas in his trance readings, such as the existence of Atlantis and the discredited theory of polygenism. In many trance sessions, he reinterpreted the history of life on earth. One of Cayce's controversial theories was polygenism. According to Cayce, five races (white, black, red, brown, and yellow) were created separately and simultaneously on different parts of Earth.

In his 2003 book The Skeptic's Dictionary, philosopher and skeptic Robert Todd Carroll wrote: "Cayce is one of the main people responsible for some of the sillier notions about Atlantis." Carroll cited some of Cayce's discredited ideas, including his belief in a giant crystal (activated by the sun to harness energy and provide power on Atlantis) and his prediction that in 1958, the United States would rediscover a death ray which had been used on Atlantis.

During the 1930s, Cayce incorrectly predicted that North America would experience existential chaos: "Los Angeles, San Francisco ... will be among those that will be destroyed before New York". He also predicted that the Second Coming of Christ would occur in 1998.

Science writers and skeptics say that Cayce's reported psychic abilities were faked or non-existent. Health experts are critical of his unorthodox treatments, such as his promotion of pseudoscientific dieting and homeopathic remedies, which they consider quackery.

Evidence of Cayce's reported clairvoyance was derived from newspaper articles, affidavits, anecdotes, testimonials and books, rather than empirical evidence which can be independently evaluated. Martin Gardner wrote that the "verified" claims and descriptions from Cayce's trances can be traced to ideas in books he had been reading by authors such as Carl Jung, P. D. Ouspensky, and Helena Blavatsky. Gardner concluded that Cayce's trance readings contain "little bits of information gleaned from here and there in the occult literature, spiced with occasional novelties from Cayce's unconscious".

Michael Shermer wrote in Why People Believe Weird Things (1997), "Uneducated beyond the ninth grade, Cayce acquired his broad knowledge through voracious reading and from this he wove elaborate tales." According to Shermer, "Cayce was fantasy-prone from his youth, often talking with angels and receiving visions of his dead grandfather." Magician James Randi said, "Cayce was fond of expressions like 'I feel that' and 'perhaps'—qualifying words used to avoid positive declarations." According to investigator Joe Nickell,

Science writer Karen Stollznow wrote,

Cayce's Association for Research and Enlightenment has also been criticized for promoting pseudoscience.

See also
 Atlantic University
 Baba Vanga
 New Age Spirituality
 Nostradamus
 Sleeping preacher

References

Notes

Citations

Bibliography
 
 
 

 Cayce, Edgar Evans. Edgar Cayce on Atlantis, New York: Hawthorn Books, 1968, 
 
 
 
 
 
 
 

 
 
 
 
 
  
 
 
 

 
 
 
 Todeschi, Kevin, Edgar Cayce on the Akashic Records, 1998,

External links

 An American Prophet from ABC News

 Article  by Shirley Abicair, in the Whole Earth Catalog, June 1971
 Edgar Cayce's Association for Research and Enlightenment (A.R.E.)
 Edgar Cayce Canada (E.C.C.)
 Edgar Cayce at Find a Grave Memorial
 

1877 births
1945 deaths
19th-century apocalypticists
20th-century apocalypticists
20th-century Christian mystics
American Christian mystics
American Disciples of Christ
American homeopaths
American occult writers
American psychics
Angelic visionaries
Atlantis proponents
Clairvoyants
New Age predecessors
New Age writers
People from Christian County, Kentucky
People from Hopkinsville, Kentucky
People from Selma, Alabama
People from Virginia Beach, Virginia
Prophets
Pseudoscientific diet advocates
Reincarnation researchers